The Miss Virgin Islands competition is the pageant that selects the representative for the territory of United States Virgin Islands in the Miss America pageant. The competition did not renew its license in 2015 and did not send a contestant to the Miss America 2016 pageant.

Winners

References

External links
 Miss Virgin Islands official website

Virgin Islands
United States Virgin Islands awards
Beauty pageants in the United States Virgin Islands
Women in the United States Virgin Islands
Recurring events established in 2004
2004 establishments in the United States Virgin Islands